Loxoblemmus is a genus of crickets in tribe Gryllini.  Species can be found in Africa, Asia and Australia.

Taxonomy
Genus contains the following species:

Loxoblemmus abotus Wang, 1992 
Loxoblemmus adina (Otte & Alexander, 1983) 
Loxoblemmus angolensis Chopard, 1962 
Loxoblemmus angulatus Bey-Bienko, 1956 
Loxoblemmus animae Bhowmik, 1967 
Loxoblemmus aomoriensis Shiraki, 1930 
Loxoblemmus appendicularis Shiraki, 1930 
Loxoblemmus arietulus Saussure, 1877 
 synonym L. campestris Matsuura, 1988 
Loxoblemmus beybienkoi Bhowmik, 1977 
Loxoblemmus billabongus (Otte & Alexander, 1983) 
Loxoblemmus bilo (Otte & Alexander, 1983) 
Loxoblemmus binyaris (Otte & Alexander, 1983) 
Loxoblemmus brevipalpus Wang, 1992 
Loxoblemmus brevipennis Chopard, 1938 
Loxoblemmus cavifrons Chopard, 1928 
Loxoblemmus chopardi Roy, 1965 
Loxoblemmus consanguineus (Chopard, 1962) 
Loxoblemmus dallacheus (Otte & Alexander, 1983) 
Loxoblemmus descarpentriesi Chopard, 1967 
Loxoblemmus detectus (Serville, 1838) 
Loxoblemmus difficilis Gorochov, 1994 
Loxoblemmus doenitzi Stein, 1881 
Loxoblemmus ellerinus (Otte & Alexander, 1983) 
Loxoblemmus equestris Saussure, 1877- type species
Loxoblemmus escalerai Bolívar, 1910 
Loxoblemmus fletcheri Chopard, 1935 
Loxoblemmus formosanus Shiraki, 1930 
Loxoblemmus globiceps Gorochov, 2001 
Loxoblemmus haanii Saussure, 1877
Loxoblemmus intermedius Chopard, 1929 
Loxoblemmus jabbarupus (Otte & Alexander, 1983) 
Loxoblemmus jacobsoni Chopard, 1927 
Loxoblemmus latifrons Chopard, 1928 
Loxoblemmus longipalpis Chopard, 1928 
Loxoblemmus macrocephalus Chopard, 1967 
Loxoblemmus magnatus Matsuura, 1985 
Loxoblemmus marookus (Otte & Alexander, 1983) 
Loxoblemmus mirio Gorochov, 1996 
Loxoblemmus monstrosus Stål, 1877 
Loxoblemmus neoarietulus Wang, 1992 
Loxoblemmus nigriceps Chopard, 1933 
Loxoblemmus nurroo Otte & Alexander, 1983 
Loxoblemmus pallens (Serville, 1838) 
Loxoblemmus parabolicus Saussure, 1877 
Loxoblemmus peraki Gorochov, 2001 
Loxoblemmus rectilineus Ma & Qiao, 2020
Loxoblemmus reticularus Liu, Yin & Liu, 1995 
Loxoblemmus sagonai Chopard, 1934 
Loxoblemmus spectabilis Gorochov & Kostia, 1993 
Loxoblemmus subangulatus Yang, 1992 
Loxoblemmus sylvestris Matsuura, 1988 
Loxoblemmus taicoun Saussure, 1877 
Loxoblemmus timliensis Bhargava, 1982 
Loxoblemmus truncatus Brunner von Wattenwyl, 1893 
Loxoblemmus tsushimensis Ichikawa, 2001 
Loxoblemmus verschuereni Chopard, 1938 
Loxoblemmus villiersi Chopard, 1967 
Loxoblemmus vividus (Sjöstedt, 1900) 
Loxoblemmus whyallus (Otte & Alexander, 1983) 
Loxoblemmus yingally (Otte & Alexander, 1983)

References

Gryllinae
Orthoptera genera
Taxa named by Henri Louis Frédéric de Saussure